Alex Rose (15 October 1898 – 28 December 1976) was a labor leader in the United Hatters of North America (UHNA) and the United Hatters, Cap and Millinery Workers International Union (UHCMW), a co-founder of the American Labor Party, and vice-chairman of the Liberal Party of New York.

Background
Alex Rose, the son of a wealthy leather tanner, was born in Warsaw, Poland. After secondary school, Rose immigrated to the United States, having been denied a Polish university education because he was Jewish.

Career
However, the outbreak of the First World War forced Rose to abandon professional aspirations and take a job as a millinery worker; in 1914 he joined the Cloth Hat, Cap, and Millinery Workers' International Union (CHCMW) and became interested in organized labor. In 1918, Rose joined the British Army, and upon returning to America in 1920 resumed union organizing activities. He worked his way through union leadership and was elected president of the United Hatters, Cap and Millinery Workers International Union (UHCMW) in 1950, where Rose sought to root out Communist and gangster influence from unions.

In 1934, the CHCMW merged with the United Hatters of North America to form the United Hatters, Cap and Millinery Workers International Union.

In 1936, Rose assisted in founding of the American Labor Party.

Because the communists acquired influence in the ALP, in 1944 Rose, along with David Dubinsky, Ben Davidson, and others founded the Liberal Party of New York. Rose became its vice-chairperson. Under Rose's leadership, the Liberal Party was quite influential in New York politics and somewhat influential in national politics, exercising power by endorsing Democratic and occasionally, liberal Republican candidates. In 1966 Rose successfully lobbied Senator Robert F. Kennedy to campaign on behalf of judge Samuel Silverman to clean up corruption from the surrogate court.

Rose was one of the most brilliant political strategists of the 20th century. Perhaps his greatest triumph was in the New York City mayoral election of 1969. John V. Lindsay was elected mayor as a fusion candidate (Republican-Liberal) in 1965, but was denied the Republican nomination in 1969. Alex Rose directed Lindsay's reelection campaign in 1969 as the Liberal candidate against both Democratic and Republican opponents so successfully that he not only was reelected, but he brought on his coat-tails enough Liberal councilmen to displace the Republicans as minority party in the City Council.

Legacy

One block of W. 186th Street in Manhattan (between Chittenden Avenue & Cabrini Boulevard) is named "Alex Rose Place."

After Rose's death in 1976, leadership of the Liberal Party passed to Raymond B. Harding, who also exerted a considerable amount of influence in New York State politics until the party lost its ballot line in 2002.

References

External sources 
 Jews in American Politics by Louis Sandy Maisel, Ira N. Forman, Donald Altschiller, and Charles Walker Bassett
 Robert Kennedy and His Times by Arthur M. Schlesinger, Jr.
 New York Day By Day; A Place for Alex Rose
 Liberal Party of New York State Records

Trade unionists from New York (state)
Jewish American people in New York (state) politics
American people of Polish-Jewish descent
Activists from New York City
American milliners
1898 births
1976 deaths
American Labor Party politicians
Liberal Party of New York politicians
Jewish American trade unionists
American trade unionists of Polish descent
20th-century American Jews
Congress Poland emigrants to the United States